Iris virginica, with the common name Virginia blueflag, Virginia iris, great blue flag, or southern blue flag, is a perennial species of flowering plant in the Iridaceae (iris) family, native to central and eastern North America.

It was identified as a separate species by Edgar Anderson, and is one of the three Iris species in Anderson's Iris flower data set, used by Ronald Fisher in his 1936 paper "The use of multiple measurements in taxonomic problems" as an example of linear discriminant analysis.

Description
The leaves have smooth margins and are bluish green to green and glabrous.

The flowers, which bloom May to July, are blue to blue-violet and are a typical iris shape. Each flower has 3 drooping sepals, called "falls", that have white marks and yellow near the throat, and 3 upright petals, called "standards".

Distribution and habitat
Iris virginica is native in the United States from Nebraska to the west, Florida and Texas to the south, New York to the east, and the Canadian border to the north. In Canada, it is native in Ontario and Quebec. It grows in wet areas, sometimes in shallow water, including marshes, wet meadows, swamps, river bottoms, sloughs, ditches, bottomland prairies, edges of sinkhole ponds, and in shallow water.

Uses
The Cherokee use this medicinal plant for traditional medicinal uses. The root is pounded into a paste that is used as a salve for the skin. An infusion made from the root is used to treat ailments of the liver, and a decoction of the root is used to treat "yellowish urine".

It may be one of the Iris species used by the Seminole to treat "shock following alligator-bite".

Iris virginica is one of three iris species in Ronald Fisher's Iris flower data set.

References

External links
Kemper Center for Home Gardening.org: Iris virginica (Virginia iris)

virginica
Flora of the Southeastern United States
Flora of the Northeastern United States

Garden plants of North America
Plants used in traditional Native American medicine
Plants described in 1753
Taxa named by Carl Linnaeus
Flora of the North-Central United States
Flora of the South-Central United States
Flora of Eastern Canada